Constituency NA-210 (Kashmore) was a constituency for the National Assembly of Pakistan. It was abolished in the 2018 delimitations after merging it with NA-209 and creating the new constituency of NA-197. This step was mainly done in view of Kashmore's elevation to district level in 2004 and the results of the 2017 census.

Election 2002 

General elections were held on 10 Oct 2002. Sardar Saleem Jan Khan Mazari of National Alliance won by 82,810 votes.

Election 2008 

General elections were held on 18 Feb 2008. Gul Muhammad Khan Jakhrani of PPP-P won by 82,189 votes.

Election 2013 

General elections were held on 11 May 2013. Ehsan ur Rehman Mazari of PPP won by 55,808 votes and became the  member of National Assembly.

References

External links 
Election result's official website

NA-210
Abolished National Assembly Constituencies of Pakistan